Əfəndilər (also, Efendilyar) is a village in the Jabrayil Rayon of Azerbaijan.

References 

Populated places in Jabrayil District